Stephen Mather (born 13 August 1973) is a New Zealand former cricketer. He played first-class cricket for Otago and Wellington between 1993 and 2001.

See also
 List of Otago representative cricketers

References

External links
 

1973 births
Living people
New Zealand cricketers
Otago cricketers
Wellington cricketers
Cricketers from Napier, New Zealand